Elections were held in the Australian state of Victoria on 15 July 1961 to elect the 66 members of the state's Legislative Assembly and 17 members of the 34-member Legislative Council. MLAs were elected for three year terms and MLCs were elected for six year terms. All were elected in single-member districts or provinces using preferential voting.

The Liberal and Country Party (LCP) government of Premier Henry Bolte won a third term in office. It was the first Victorian election at which all seats in both houses were contested by at least two candidates, and the first at which both houses were contested on the same day.

Key dates

Results

Legislative Assembly

The election produced almost no change in the electoral balance.

|}

Legislative Council

|}

Seats changing hands

 In addition, the LCP retained the seat of Ballarat North which it had won from the Country party at the 1960 by-election.

See also
 Candidates of the 1961 Victorian state election
 Members of the Victorian Legislative Assembly, 1958–1961
 Members of the Victorian Legislative Assembly, 1961–1964
 Bolte Ministry

References

Elections in Victoria (Australia)
1961 elections in Australia
1960s in Victoria (Australia)
July 1961 events in Australia